The 20th Texas Cavalry Regiment was a unit of mounted volunteers from Texas that fought in the Confederate States Army during the American Civil War. The regiment formed in spring and summer 1862 and served in the Indian Territory and Arkansas for its entire career. In late 1862, it fought at McGuire's Store and Prairie Grove. The regiment fought at Honey Springs and Bayou Fourche in 1863. The unit was in action at Middle Boggy Depot, Prairie D'Ane, Poison Springs, Marks' Mills, and Cabin Creek in 1864. The regiment surrendered to the Union Army in June 1865.

See also
List of Texas Civil War Confederate units

Notes

References

Units and formations of the Confederate States Army from Texas
1862 establishments in Texas
1865 disestablishments in Texas
Military units and formations disestablished in 1865
Military units and formations established in 1862